The 2001–02 Florida Gators men's basketball team represented the University of Florida in the sport of basketball during the 2001–02 college basketball season.  The Gators competed in Division I of the National Collegiate Athletic Association (NCAA) and the Eastern Division of the Southeastern Conference (SEC).  They were led by head coach Billy Donovan, and played their home games in the O'Connell Center on the university's Gainesville, Florida campus.

The Gators were the SEC Eastern Division champions, winning a share of the division title for the third straight season.  They earned a No. 5 seed in the 2002 NCAA tournament, falling to Creighton in the first round in double overtime.  It was the first time in Gators basketball history that the team advanced to the NCAA Tournament for a fourth consecutive year.

Roster

Coaches

Schedule and results

|-
!colspan=9 style=| Regular Season

|-
!colspan=9 style=| SEC Tournament

|-
!colspan=9 style=| NCAA Tournament

References

Florida Gators men's basketball seasons
Florida
Florida
Florida Gators men's basketball team
Florida Gators men's basketball team